The 1927 Hamburg state election was held on 9 October 1927 to elect the 160 members of the Hamburg Parliament.

Results

References 

1927 elections in Germany
1927
October 1927 events